This is a chronological summary of the major events of the 2022 Winter Paralympics held in Beijing, China.

Calendar

Medal table

Day-by-day summaries

Day 0 — Friday 4 March

 The opening ceremony was held at Beijing National Stadium at 20:00 China Standard Time (UTC+8).

Day 1 — Saturday 5 March

Alpine skiing

Biathlon

Para ice hockey

 United States won 5–0 against Canada in a preliminary round match.
 Czech Republic won 5–0 against Italy in a preliminary round match.
 China won 7–0 against Slovakia in a preliminary round match.

Wheelchair curling

 Draw 1 and Draw 2 were held.

Day 2 — Sunday 6 March

Alpine skiing

Cross-country skiing

Para ice hockey

 United States won 9–1 against South Korea in a preliminary round match.
 Italy won 2–1 against Slovakia in a preliminary round match.
 China won 5–1 against Czech Republic in a preliminary round match.

Snowboarding

 The qualification rounds of the women's snowboard cross and men's snowboard cross events were held.

Wheelchair curling

 Draw 3, Draw 4 and Draw 5 were held.

Day 3 — Monday 7 March

Alpine skiing

Cross-country skiing

Snowboarding

Wheelchair curling

 Draw 6, Draw 7 and Draw 8 were held.

Day 4 — Tuesday 8 March

Biathlon

Para ice hockey

 Canada won 6–0 against South Korea in a preliminary round match.
 China won 6–0 against Italy in a preliminary round match.
 Czech Republic won 3–0 against Slovakia in a preliminary round match.

Wheelchair curling

 Draw 9, Draw 10 and Draw 11 were held.

Day 5 — Wednesday 9 March

Cross-country skiing

Para ice hockey

 South Korea won 4–0 against Italy in a quarterfinal match.
 China won 4–3 against Czech Republic in a quarterfinal match.

Wheelchair curling

 Draw 12, Draw 13 and Draw 14 were held.

Day 6 — Thursday 10 March

Alpine skiing

Wheelchair curling

 Draw 15, Draw 16 and Draw 17 were held.

Day 7 — Friday 11 March

Alpine skiing

Biathlon

Para ice hockey

 Canada won 11–0 against South Korea in a semifinal match.
 United States won 11–0 against China in a semifinal match.

Snowboarding

Wheelchair curling

 China won against Canada in a semifinal match.
 Sweden won against Slovakia in a semifinal match.
 Canada won against Slovakia in the bronze medal match.

Day 8 — Saturday 12 March

Alpine skiing

Cross-country skiing

Para ice hockey

 China won 4–0 against South Korea in the bronze medal match.

Wheelchair curling

 China won against Sweden in the gold medal match.

Day 9 — Sunday 13 March

Alpine skiing

Cross-country skiing

Para ice hockey

 United States won 5–0 against Canada in the gold medal match.

Ceremonies

 The closing ceremony was held at Beijing National Stadium at 20:00 China Standard Time (UTC+8).

References

2022 Winter Paralympics
2022